"Ticket to Nowhere" is the 20th television play episode of the first season of the Australian anthology television series Australian Playhouse. "Ticket to Nowhere" was written by John Bragg and directed by Fred Maxian and originally aired on ABC on 29 August 1966.

Plot
A man finds himself with an unusual fellow-passenger on a long train journey. He thinks the man is trying to steal his identity.

Cast
 Terry Norris as Fuller
 Wynn Roberts
 Lynne Flanagan
 Terry McDermott
 Allan Rowe as the ticket collector

Production
Director Fred Maxian normally did variety shows.

Reception
The Age called it "good stage craft. It fitted well into the half hour."

See also
 List of television plays broadcast on Australian Broadcasting Corporation (1960s)

References

External links
 
 
 

1966 television plays
1966 Australian television episodes
1960s Australian television plays
Australian Playhouse (season 1) episodes
Black-and-white television episodes